An acoustic interferometer is an instrument, using interferometry, for measuring the physical characteristics of sound waves in a gas or liquid. It may be used to measure velocity, wavelength, absorption, or impedance. A vibrating crystal creates the ultrasonic waves that are radiated into the medium. The waves strike a reflector placed  parallel to the crystal. The waves are then reflected back to the source and measured.

See also
 Acoustic microscopy

References

Acoustics